Deborah Scanzio (born  in Faido) is a Swiss-born Italian freestyle skier, specializing in Moguls.

Scanzio competed at the 2006 and 2010 Winter Olympics for Italy. Her best finish was in moguls, when she placed 13th in the qualifying round, and 9th in the final. In 2010, she again advanced to the moguls final, advancing to the final, where she placed 8th.

As of April 2013, she has one World Championships medal, a bronze in the moguls event in 2007.

Scanzio made her World Cup debut in December 2002. As of April 2013, she has three World Cup podium finishes, taking silver each time, twice in 2007/08 and once in 2006/07. Her best World Cup overall finish in moguls is 9th, in 2007/08.

World Cup Podiums

References

1986 births
Living people
Olympic freestyle skiers of Italy
Freestyle skiers at the 2006 Winter Olympics
Freestyle skiers at the 2010 Winter Olympics
Freestyle skiers at the 2014 Winter Olympics
Freestyle skiers at the 2018 Winter Olympics
People from Faido
Italian female freestyle skiers